RV4 may refer to:
 Mandala 4, the fourth mandala of the Rigveda
 Norwegian National Road 4
 Van's Aircraft RV-4, a kit aircraft